The Cuban solitaire (Myadestes elisabeth), also known as the Cuban nightingale, is a species of bird in the family Turdidae. It is endemic to Cuba.

Its natural habitat is montane moist forests. It is threatened by habitat loss.

References

Cuban solitaire
Endemic birds of Cuba
Cuban solitaire
Cuban solitaire
Taxonomy articles created by Polbot